The following is a list of amphibians that are known to inhabit the US State of Iowa. The list includes frogs, toads, and salamanders.

Frogs and toads
There are 17 species of frogs and toads in Iowa.

Salamanders
There are 5 species of salamanders in Iowa.

See also
 List of reptiles of Iowa

References

External links
Reptiles and Amphibians of Iowa

Amphibians
Iowa
.Amphibians